Eric Sheppard (born 1 October 1950) is a British and American geographer, and Professor of Economic geography at UCLA.

Background 
Sheppard grew up in Cambridge, England and studied geography at the University of Bristol under Peter Haggett (graduating 1972) before moving to Canada and completing his Ph.D in Geography in 1976 at the University of Toronto. He taught for most of his career at the University of Minnesota before moving to UCLA. He served as president of the Association of American Geographers (2012-2013).

Contributions
Sheppard has made contributions to geographical political economy, uneven geographies of globalization, spatial capitalist economic dynamics, urban sustainability and environmental justice, and the use of critical geographic information technologies. He is identified with a group of radical economic geographers including Trevor J. Barnes and Jamie Peck, who are critical of the tendency of the modern capitalist economy to create great differences in wealth and poverty, and to create environmental problems and injustices.

Awards
Distinguished Scholarship Honors, Association of American Geographers (1999)
Ellen Churchill Semple award, Department of Geography, University of Kentucky, 2000
Fellow, Center for Advanced Studies in the Social and Behavioral Sciences, Stanford University (2005-6)
Regents Professor, University of Minnesota (2008–12)

Publications
The Capitalist Space Economy:  Geographical Analysis after Ricardo Marx and Sraffa (with T. J. Barnes). London:  Unwin and Hyman, 1990. 328 pp.
Modeling and predicting aggregate flows. In: Susan Hanson (editor). The geography of urban transportation. New York: Guilford Press, 1995. 
Rediscovering Geography: New relevance for the new century (with T. Wilbanks and 14 others). Washington DC: National Research Council, 1996. 233 pp.
A World of Difference: Society, Nature, Development (with P. W. Porter). New York: Guilford Press, 1998. 602 pp.
A Companion to Economic Geography (co-edited with T. Barnes). Oxford: Basil Blackwell, 2000, 2003. 590 pp. (translated into Chinese, published by the Commercial Press of China, 2008)
Geography or economics? Conceptions of space, time, interdependence, and agency.'''' In: Gordon L. Clark, Maryann P. Feldman and Meric S. Gertler (editors). The Oxford handbook of economic geography. Oxford (England): Oxford University Press, 2000. Reading Economic Geography (co--edited with T. Barnes, J. Peck and A. Tickell). Oxford: Blackwell, 2004, 432 pp. (translated into Chinese, published by the Commercial Press of China, 2007)Scale and Geographic Inquiry (co-edited with R. B. McMaster). Oxford: Blackwell, 2004, 272 pp.
Contesting Neoliberalism: Urban Frontiers (co-edited with H. Leitner and J. Peck). New York: Guilford Press, 2007, 340 pp.Politics and Practice in Economic Geography (co-edited with T. Barnes, J. Peck and A. Tickell). Beverly Hills: Sage Publishers, 2007, 320 pp.A World of Difference: Encountering and contesting development (second, fully revised and expanded edition with P. W. Porter, R. Nagar and D. Faust).  New York: Guilford Press, 2009, 664 pp.The Wiley-Blackwell Companion to Economic Geography'' (co-edited with T. Barnes and J. Peck). London: Wiley-Blackwell, 2012.

References

Eric Sheppard at the Department of Geography, University of Minnesota.

University of Toronto alumni
Alumni of the University of Bristol
American geographers
University of Minnesota faculty
British geographers
People from Cambridge
1950 births
Living people
Economic geographers
Presidents of the American Association of Geographers